Pin Up Girl is a 1944 American Technicolor musical romantic comedy motion picture starring Betty Grable, John Harvey, Martha Raye, and Joe E. Brown.

Directed by H. Bruce Humberstone and produced by William LeBaron, the screenplay was adapted by Robert Ellis, Helen Logan and Earl Baldwin based on a short story titled Imagine Us! (1942) by Libbie Block.

Pin Up Girl capitalized on Grable's iconic pin-up status during World War II, even using her famous swimsuit photo in portions of the movie.

Plot
Lorry Jones (Betty Grable) is working as a hostess at the local USO canteen in "Missoula, Missouri," where she performs as a singer and signs photographs of herself for adoring soldiers.

It is her job to keep them happy and routinely accept every marriage proposal. One of her suitors, Marine Sergeant George Davis (Roger Clark), does not realize she has no real intention of marrying him.

Meanwhile, Lorry and her best friend, Kay Pritchett (Dorothea Kent), have accepted jobs as stenographers in Washington, D.C., but they tell the soldiers that they are going on a USO tour.

The night before leaving for Washington, D.C., they go out partying in New York City. Upon arriving in the city by train, they are welcomed by Navy hero Tommy Dooley (John Harvey), who fought at the Battle of Guadalcanal.

That night, they try to get into the Club Chartreuse, but are not allowed to go in without escorts. Lorry does not want to leave and tells the lie that she is meeting Tommy and his friend, Dud Miller (Dave Willock), in the club. She is not aware that Tommy is the best friend of Eddie Hall (Joe E. Brown), the club's owner. When Eddie is told that Lorry and Kay are escorts of Tommy, he lavishes them with champagne.

When Tommy and Dud arrive, Tommy thinks Eddie has set them up in blind dates with the girls. Dud believes the two women are actresses. Before Tommy can prove Dud wrong, Kay drunkenly tells them she and Lorry are in the Broadway musical Remember Me.

Molly McKay (Martha Raye), star singer at the club, does not believe Kay, until Lorry, telling everyone her name is Laura Lorraine, performs a song without trouble. Lorry and Kay eventually spend their night dancing with Tommy and Dud and leave for Washington the next morning. The men lose the women's address by accident. Two weeks later, Lorry and Kay are insulted with not having heard from their beaus.

Meanwhile, Lorry is bored with her life as a stenographer, until Tommy and Dud surprisingly show up in Washington. Lorry is assigned as his stenographer, but does not want him to find out her real career. She decides to disguise herself, so he will not recognize her as Laura.

Lorry sets up a date between Tommy and "Laura." At their date, Tommy tells her he loves dating an actress. She is hurt and tells him she is going to give up her stage life. Tommy responds by offering her a job at Eddie's club. Molly is jealous when she finds out, but sees an opportunity to get rid of her when George comes to town and recognizes her as Lorry. She introduces George to Tommy, who is insulted when he hears the truth. When Lorry finds out what has happened, she tells George she has no intention of marrying him.

Laura then dresses as stenographer Lorry and visits Tommy to beg him to give "Laura" another chance. Things do not go her way, however, so she reveals that she is both Lorry and Laura. Tommy eventually forgives her.

Cast
 Betty Grable as Lorry Jones/Laura Lorraine
 John Harvey as Tommy Dooley
 Martha Raye as Molly McKay
 Joe E. Brown as Eddie Hall
 Eugene Pallette as Barney Briggs
 Dorothea Kent as Kay Pritchett
 Dave Willock as Dud Miller
 Charlie Spivak as Himself (bandleader)
 Roger Clark as Marine Sgt. George Davis (uncredited)
 Nat 'King' Cole as Canteen Pianist
 Hermes Pan as Apache Dancer
 Adele Jergens as Canteen Worker
 Bess Flowers as Arriving Club Diplomacy Patron
 June Hutton as June Hutton - Singer with Spivak Band
 Reed Hadley as Radio Announcer (voice)
 Lillian Porter as Cigarette Girl

Production and release
In October 1942, Linda Darnell and Don Ameche were set to star. However, it was decided the movie would be made as a musical, thereby replacing Darnell by musical actress Betty Grable. She was seven months pregnant when the movie was completed.

When Pin Up Girl was released, it received mixed reviews from critics. Variety wrote: "This is one of those escapist filmusicals which makes no pretenses at ultra-realism, and if you get into the mood fast that it's something to occupy your attention for an hour and a half. It's all very pleasing and pleasant." The New York Times criticized the script, stating it was a "spiritless blob of a musical." However, it praised Grable.

Soundtracks
 You're My Little Pin Up Girl
 Music by James V. Monaco
 Lyrics by Mack Gordon
 Sung by chorus, uncredited players, and Betty Grable
 Danced by the Condos Brothers
 Time Alone Will Tell
 Music by James V. Monaco
 Lyrics by Mack Gordon
 Sung by June Hutton and The Stardusters with Charlie Spivak and His Orchestra
 Red Robins, Bobwhites and Bluebirds
 Music by James V. Monaco
 Lyrics by Mack Gordon
 Performed by Martha Raye
 Danced by Gloria Nord and the Skating Vanities
 Don't Carry Tales out of School
 Music by James V. Monaco
 Lyrics by Mack Gordon
 Performed by Betty Grable and chorus with Charlie Spivak and His Orchestra
 Yankee Doodle Hayride
 Music by James V. Monaco
 Lyrics by Mack Gordon
 Performed by Martha Raye with Charlie Spivak and His Orchestra
 Danced by the Condos Brothers
 Once Too Often
 Music by James V. Monaco
 Lyrics by Mack Gordon
 Sung by Betty Grable
 Danced by Betty Grable, Hermes Pan and Angela Blue with Charlie Spivak and His Orchestra
 The Story of the Very Merry Widow
 Music by James V. Monaco
 Lyrics by Mack Gordon
 Performed by Betty Grable with chorus
 The Caisson Song
 Music by Edmund L. Gruber
 Played briefly during the opening credits
 Anchors Aweigh
 Music by Charles A. Zimmerman
 Played briefly during the opening credits
 The Marine Hymn
 Music by Jacques Offenbach from Geneviève de Brabant
 Played briefly during the opening credits
 You'll Never Know
 Music by Harry Warren
 Played on the trumpet after the "Yankee Doodle Hayride" number
 The Army Air Corps Song
 Music by Robert Crawford
 Played briefly during the opening credits
 Minnie's in the Money
 Music by Harry Warren
 Played when the protest proclamation is read to Lorry
 Goin' to the County Fair
 Music by Harry Warren
 Played when Eddie Hall stops by Lorry and Kay's table

References

External links
 
 
 
 

1944 films
1940s romantic musical films
1944 romantic comedy films
20th Century Fox films
Films directed by H. Bruce Humberstone
Films based on short fiction
American musical comedy films
American romantic musical films
American romantic comedy films
1940s English-language films
1940s American films